Celebrity Circus is an American version of the Celebrity Circus reality television show based on the Portuguese television series of Circo das Celebridades, not to be confused with Australian TV series of the same name that aired in 2005. The show is produced by Endemol USA with Matt Kunitz as executive producer and Rick Ringbakk as co-executive producer.

On March 13, 2009, it was confirmed that the series had been canceled and would not be returning for a second season.

Format 
The show is hosted by Joey Fatone. The judges for the series are Olympic gymnast Mitch Gaylord, contortionist Aurelia Cats and choreographer Louie Spence who is also a judge on the British version.

The celebrities are trained to perform various circus acts, and compete with each other for points from the judges and phone votes from the public on premium rated lines or by online voting via the official website. The acts are interspersed with banter and video from the training sessions and interviews. The two scores are combined, 50% judges vote and 50% phone votes, and the celebrity with the lowest combined score is eliminated.

Season 1 
NBC announced the first season of Celebrity Circus on January 18, 2008 on the same day ABC announced it was in negotiations on a revival of Circus of the Stars. On March 8, 2008 NBC announced the network's 2008 summer schedule with a two-hour premiere on June 11, 2008. Shortly after, on April 16, 2008 ABC announced the network decided to pass on a revival of Circus of the Stars due to NBC premiering Celebrity Circus.

NBC later announced that Celebrity Circus would have a ninety-minute premiere on June 11, 2008 instead of a two-hour premiere. Beginning on Wednesday, June 18, 2008 Celebrity Circus will air one-hour episodes at 9:00 PM ET/PT. NBC announced on April 23, 2008 the host for the show would be  former *NSYNC member Joey Fatone with originally Antonio Sabato, Jr., Blu Cantrell, Christopher Knight, Janet Evans, Jason "Wee Man" Acuña and Rachel Hunter taking part. A seventh celebrity, Stacey Dash was revealed on June 9, 2008.

In Week 3, Stacey Dash earned the first 10. In Week 4, Wee Man earned the first average of 10.

Blu Cantrell was the first contestant eliminated from the Celebrity Circus on June 18, 2008. Janet Evans was the second contestant eliminated from the show on June 25, 2008.  Christopher Knight was not eliminated on July 2, 2008, but was forced to withdraw after breaking his arm again during rehearsal (he had fractured it in Week 1).

Celebrities 
Celebrities taking part in Celebrity Circus are:

Elimination

References

External links 
Official Website
Website (via Internet Archive)
 

2000s American reality television series
2008 American television series debuts
2008 American television series endings
NBC original programming
Circus television shows
English-language television shows
Television series by Endemol